Biricodar or incel (INN, codename VX-710) was a pharmaceutical drug under development by Vertex Pharmaceuticals to help treat ovarian cancer patients, that never reached the market.

External links
Article on development
Status of Vertex development
PSLgroup article
AARC article about the drug

Antineoplastic drugs